Super Dimension Fortress Macross is an anime series created by Studio Nue. The series ran from October 3, 1982 to June 26, 1983 over 36 episodes.

The series was originally licensed by AnimEigo, who restored the series and released it on DVD with Japanese audio and English subtitles.
 At first a limited edition pre-order boxset was released on December 21, 2001. Three smaller boxsets, each comprising three discs, were released from September 10, 2002. Finally, Animeigo released 9 individual volumes

The series was then licensed by ADV, who re-released the series with an English dub alongside the original Japanese audio and English subtitles. The seven individual volumes were released between January 10, 2006 and December 19, 2006 and a complete collection followed on October 21, 2008.

On July 25, 2014, Lionsgate Home Entertainment announced that they would release a new Robotech DVD collection entitled Robotech: The Classic Collection exclusively through Amazon.com. Volume 1 contains the first 18 episodes of Robotech: The Macross Saga as it was originally broadcast, and the first 18 episodes of Macross, completely uncut and in Japanese with English subtitles.

In Japan, a boxset containing the entire series created from HD remastered video was released as "The Super Dimension Fortress Macross Memorial Box" on February 22, 2008.

The Series uses two pieces of music as opening and ending themes. The opening theme "Macross" and the ending theme "Runner" were both performed by Makoto Fujiwara. Episode 36 used a version of "Runner" performed by Mari Iijima.

Episodes

References

External links
"Comparison between original video and Animeigo's restoration"

Episodes
Super Dimension Fortress Macross

ru:Гиперпространственная крепость Макросс#Список серий